Desmotes is a monotypic genus of flowering plants belonging to the family Rutaceae. The only species is Desmotes incomparabilis.

The species is found in Central America.

References

Rutaceae
Monotypic Rutaceae genera